Jennifer O'Neill (born February 20, 1948) is a Brazilian-born American actress, model, author, and activist. She is known for her modeling and spokesperson work for CoverGirl cosmetics starting in 1963, and her starring role in the Oscar-winning 1971 film Summer of '42.

She also starred in the Howard Hawks western Rio Lobo (1970), and worked in Italian cinema, such as Lucio Fulci's famous giallo horror film Sette note in nero and Luchino Visconti's final film The Innocent (1976). She starred in the cult horror film Scanners (1981), the Rachel Scott biopic I'm Not Ashamed (2016), and the short-lived television series Cover Up (1984–85). Since the 1990s, O'Neill has been a born-again Christian and active in the pro-life movement, and has worked as a motivational speaker.

Early life
O'Neill was born in Rio de Janeiro, Brazil. Her mother was English and her father was a Brazilian of Portuguese, Spanish and Irish ancestry. She and her older brother Michael were raised in New Rochelle, New York, and Wilton, Connecticut. When she was 14, the family moved to New York City. On Easter Sunday, 1962, O'Neill attempted suicide because the move would separate her from her dog Mandy and horse Monty — "her whole world". That same year, she was discovered by the Ford modeling agency. By age 15, while attending the prestigious Dalton School in Manhattan, she was appearing on the covers of Vogue, Cosmopolitan, and Seventeen, earning $80,000 ($ today)
in 1962.

An accomplished equestrienne, O'Neill won upwards of 200 ribbons at horse show competitions in her teens. With her modelling fees, she had purchased a horse, named Alezon. However, it once balked before a wall at a horse show, throwing her, and breaking her neck and back in three places. She attended New York City's Professional Children's School and the Dalton School in Manhattan, but dropped out to wed her first husband, IBM executive Dean Rossiter, at age 17.

Career

In 1968 O'Neill landed a small role in For Love of Ivy. In 1970 she played her first lead role in the Howard Hawks film Rio Lobo with her co-star John Wayne. She had a supporting role in Otto Preminger's Such Good Friends (1971) starring Dyan Cannon and Ken Howard.

In the 1971 film Summer of '42, O'Neill played Dorothy Walker, the early-20s wife of an airman who has gone off to fight in World War II. She stated in a 2002 interview that her agent had to fight to even get a reading for the part, since the role had been cast for an "older woman" to a "coming of age" 15-year-old boy, and the director was only considering actresses over the age of thirty.

In 1972, she co-starred with Tom Jones in David Winters's television special The Special London Bridge Special.

O'Neill continued acting for the next two decades. She appeared in Hollywood feature films, made-for-television films, and European films,

In 1976, she acted in Luchino Visconti's last film, The Innocent.

She was originally cast in the Disney film The Black Hole (1979), but was told she needed to cut her hair because it would be easier to film the zero-G scenes. She gave in, drinking wine during the haircut and leaving noticeably impaired. She lost the part after a serious car crash on the way home.

When her movie career slowed, O'Neill took roles in series television. She starred in NBC's short-lived 1982 prime time soap opera Bare Essence and played the lead female role on the 1984 television series Cover Up. On October 12, 1984, Jon-Erik Hexum, O'Neill's co-star in the Cover Up television series, mortally wounded himself on the show's set, unaware that a gun loaded with a blank cartridge could still cause extreme damage from the effect of expanding powder gases. He died six days later.

O'Neill is listed in the Smithsonian Institution's National Museum of American History's Center for Advertising History for her long-standing contract with CoverGirl cosmetics as its model and spokesperson in ads and television commercials.

Activism
In 2004, O'Neill wrote and published From Fallen to Forgiven, a book of biographical notes and thoughts about life and existence. O'Neill recounted how she underwent an abortion while dating a Wall Street socialite after the divorce from her first husband. Her regrets over the experience contributed to her becoming an anti-abortion activist and a born-again Christian in 1986 at age 38. She also began counseling abstinence to teens. Concerning her abortion, she writes:

O'Neill continues to be active as a writer working on her second autobiography, CoverStory, an inspirational speaker, and fundraiser for the benefit of crisis pregnancy centers across the United States. She has also served as the spokesperson for the Silent No More Awareness Campaign, an organization for people who regret that they or their partners had abortions.

Personal life
O'Neill has been married nine times to eight husbands (she married, divorced, and remarried her sixth husband Richard Alan Brown). She has three children from three husbands.

 Dean Rossiter	(1965–1971, divorced, 1 child)
 Joseph Koster	(1972–1974, divorced)
 Nick De Noia (1975–1976, divorced)
 Jeff Barry (1978–1979, divorced)
 John Lederer	(1979–1983, divorced, 1 child)
 Richard Alan Brown (1986–1989, divorced, 1 child)
 Neil L. Bonin	(1992–1993, annulled)
 Richard Alan Brown (1993–1996, divorced)
 Mervin Sidney Louque Jr. (1996–present)

Ex-husband Nick de Noia was murdered in 1987 by one of his former associates.

On October 23, 1982, O'Neill suffered a gunshot wound in her home on McClain Street in Bedford, New York. Police officers who interviewed O'Neill determined that she had accidentally shot herself in the abdomen with a .38 caliber revolver at her 30-acre, 25-room French-style estate while trying to determine if the weapon was loaded. Her husband at the time, John Lederer, was not in the house when the handgun was discharged, but two other people were in the house. Detective Sgt. Thomas Rothwell was quoted as having said that O'Neill "didn't know much about guns."

In her 1999 autobiography Surviving Myself, O'Neill describes many of her life experiences, including her marriages, career, and her move to her Tennessee farm in the late 1990s. She has said that she wrote the autobiography (her first book) "... at the prompting of her children."

O'Neill has dual citizenship, being a Brazilian and U.S. citizen.

Filmography

Film

Television

Books published 
Surviving Myself,  New York: William Morrow and Company, 1999.
From Fallen to Forgiven, Thomas Nelson, 2002.
You're Not Alone: Healing Through God's Grace After Abortion.  Faith Communications, 2005.
Remarkable Women, Insight Publishing Group, 2005.
A Fall Together, B&H Publishing Group, 2006.
A Winter of Wonders, B&H Publishing Group, 2007.
A Late Spring Frost, B&H Publishing Group, 2007
Faith Lessons, Insight Publishing Group, 2008.

References

External links
 
 
 

1948 births
Living people
People from Rio de Janeiro (city)
Brazilian people of English descent
Brazilian people of Spanish descent
Brazilian people of Irish descent
Brazilian emigrants to the United States
Actresses from New Rochelle, New York
Activists from New Rochelle, New York
Actresses from Rio de Janeiro (city)
American anti-abortion activists
20th-century American actresses
21st-century American actresses
Dalton School alumni
American people of Brazilian descent
American people of Spanish descent
American people of Irish descent
American people of English descent
American Christians